USS Wanaloset, also spelled USS Wanalosett, was a proposed United States Navy screw  sloop-of-war or steam frigate that appears never to have been laid down.

Wanaloset was a wooden-hulled bark-rigged (or ship-rigged) Contoocook-class screw sloop-of-war or steam frigate with a single funnel scheduled to be built at Baltimore, Maryland, by the firm of Hazelhurst and Wiegard. Although carried on the Navy List of January 1865, she was one of six units of her class that were cancelled; her keel apparently never was laid down and her hull certainly never was built. Her engines, however, were completed, and they were installed in the screw steamer  .

The name Wanaloset was dropped from the Navy List about 1867.

See also

References

Notes

Bibliography
 

 

Sailing frigates of the United States Navy
Cancelled ships of the United States Navy
Ships built in Baltimore
Steam frigates